The Canton Fair or China Import and Export Fair, is a trade fair held in the spring and autumn seasons each year since the spring of 1957 in Canton (Guangzhou), Guangdong, China. It is the oldest, largest, and the most representative trade fair in China.

Its full name since 2007 has been China Import and Export Fair, renamed from Chinese Export Commodities Fair. The fair is co-hosted by the Ministry of Commerce of China and the provincial government of Guangdong Province and organized by China Foreign Trade Centre.

Contents
The National Pavilion (export section) of Canton Fair is sorted into 16 categories of products, which will be exhibited in 51 sections. Over 24,000 of China's best foreign trade corporations (enterprises) take part in the fair. These include private enterprises, factories, scientific research institutions, wholly foreign-owned enterprises, and foreign trade companies.

Functions
The fair leans to export trade, though import business is also done here. Apart from the above-mentioned, various types of business activities such as economic and technical cooperation and exchange, commodity inspection, insurance, transportation, advertising, and trade consultation are other activities that are also commonly carried out at the fair.

Basic facts
 The 127th Canton Fair: The 2020 Fair was postponed due to the COVID-19 pandemic.

 First held: April 1957.
 Interval: Three phases per session; two sessions per year.
 Spring session: April 15–19 (Phase 1); April 23–27 (Phase 2); May 1–5 (Phase 3).  
 Autumn session: October 15–19 (Phase 1); October 23–27 (Phase 2); October 31- November 4 (Phase 3).
 Industries:
 Phase 1: Electronics & Household Electrical Appliances, Lighting Equipment, Vehicles & Spare Parts, Machinery, Hardware & Tools, Energy + Resources, Chemical Products, Building Materials, International Pavilion 
 Phase 2: Consumer Goods, Gifts, Home Decorations
 Phase 3: Office Supplies, Cases & Bags, and Recreation Products, Medical Devices and Health Products, Food, Shoes, Textiles & Garments, International Pavilion
 Venue:
China Import and Export Fair (Pazhou) Complex, 380 Yuejiangzhong Road, Haizhu District, Guangzhou 510335 
 Gross exhibition space: .
 Number of booths: Over 60,400 standard stands (122nd Session).
 Varieties: Over 160,000.
 Business turnover: 30,160 million USD (122nd Session).
 Number of trading countries and regions: 213 (122nd Session).
 Number of visitors: 191,950 (122nd Session).
 Exhibitors: Over 25,000 (with 24,429 Chinese exhibitors, 620 international exhibitors, 122nd Session).

See also
China International Consumer Goods Fair

References

Events in Guangzhou
Trade fairs in China
Tourist attractions in Guangzhou
1957 establishments in China